= Bitova Electronika =

- Industry: Electronics Systems
- Predecessor: Zavod za Radiotechnichesa aparatura
- Founded: 1960; 66 years ago in Veliko Tarnovo
- Defunct: 2014
- Fate: Bankruptcy
- Headquarters: Bulgaria
- Number of employees: 6,012 (1983)

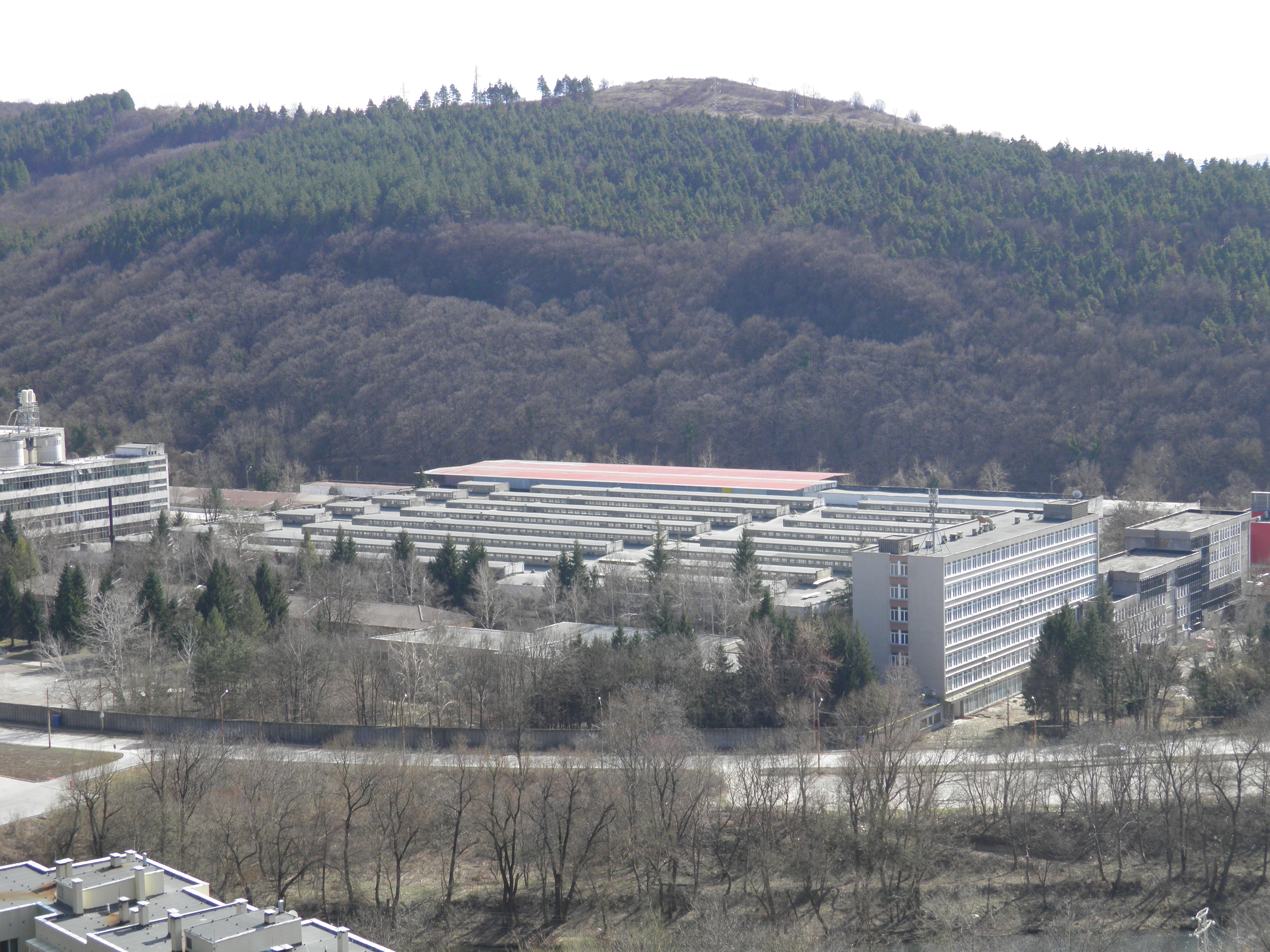

Bitova Electronika Ltd was a Bulgarian manufacturer of electronics and military radars that was established in 1960 in Veliko Tarnovo, Bulgaria as Zavod za Radiotechnichesa aparatura (English: Factory for Radio Equipment). The first factory was located north from Veliko Tarnovo in Dervenya. Later, a new factory was built in the new south industrial zone. In 1961, the factory made the first Bulgarian radio Komsomolets. Three years later, it built PCBs. In the next years, the radios "Progres", " Echo", "Tenor", "Lyra" and others were made by the company.

Since 1975, the company manufactured Sofia televisions Sofia. The company produces the white-black television Veliko Tarnovo T3106. In 1984, the company constructed color TV, Veliko Tarnovo 84. From 84 were produced more than 2 000 000 units. The electronic products from Veliko Tarnovo take the name Resprom. In 1983, 6,012 people worked in the factory. Next year were launched TV - Veliko Tarnovo 85. In the beginning of 90s, it were launched TC 5122 and TC 51015 with parts from Philips. In the 90s, the company was renamed to Bitova Electronika Ltd. It went bankrupt in 2014.

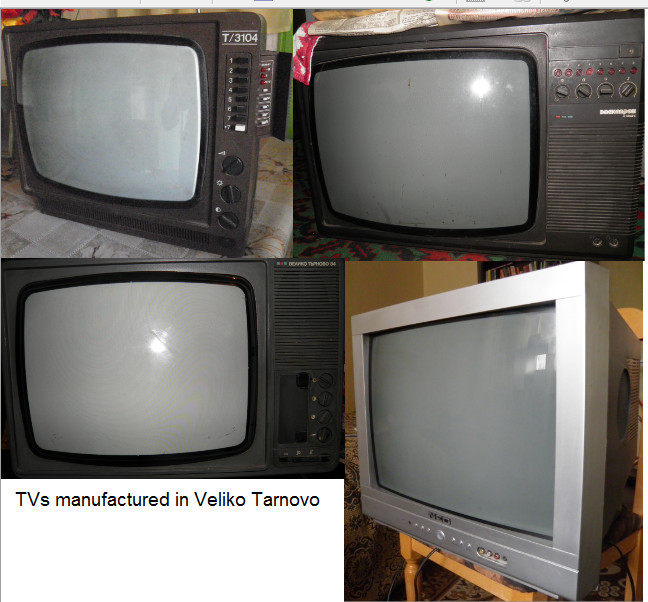
Television receiver made in the factory

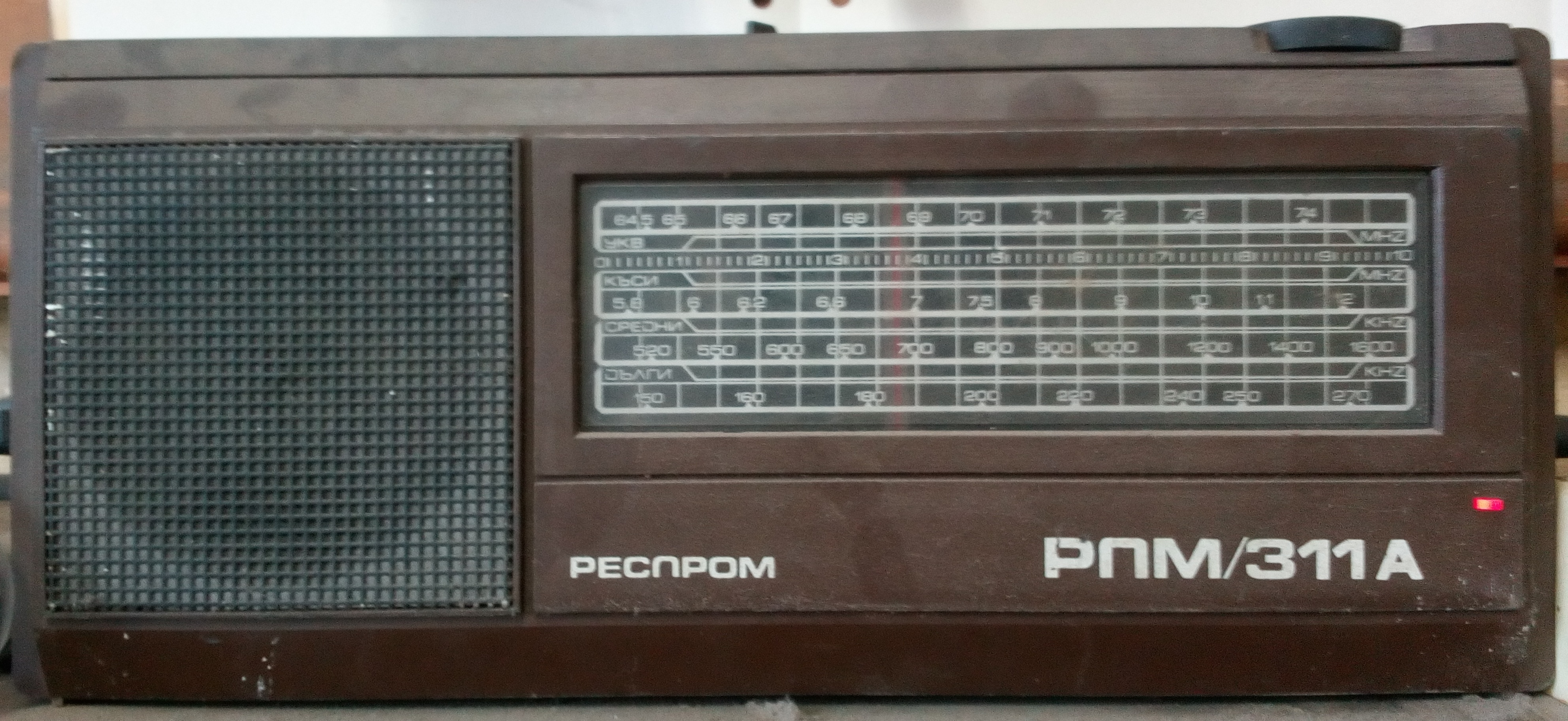
RPM311
